Esther Scott (April 13, 1953 – February 14, 2020) was an American actress.

Early years
Scott was born in Flushing, Queens, New York, on April 13, 1953. When she was a child the family moved to Brooklyn, New York. She developed an interest in acting while she was a student at Bronx High School of Science. She later moved to California and graduated with a degree in theater arts from San Francisco State University.

Career 
Scott began her career as voice actress on Star Wars: Ewoks, before appearing on television shows including Beverly Hills, 90210, Full House, Party of Five, Ellen, The Steve Harvey Show, and Sister, Sister.

Scott was a regular cast member in the short-lived ABC sitcom The Geena Davis Show (2000-2001) playing Geena Davis' housekeeper, Gladys. She also had the recurring roles on City Guys (1998-2001), short-lived The Help (2004) as Doris, and Hart of Dixie (2011-2015) as Delma Warner. In film, she has appeared in Boyz n the Hood (1991), The Kid (2000), You Got Served (2004), Dreamgirls (2006),  Gangster Squad (2013), and The Birth of a Nation (2016).

Death 
Scott died on February 14, 2020, in Los Angeles, after suffering a heart attack.

Filmography

References

External links

1953 births
2020 deaths
African-American actresses
American film actresses
American television actresses
20th-century American actresses
21st-century American actresses
People from Queens, New York
Actresses from New York City
20th-century African-American women
20th-century African-American people
21st-century African-American women
21st-century African-American people
San Francisco State University alumni